Sissel Vera Pettersen (born January 28, 1977 in Oslo, Norway is a Norwegian jazz vocalist, saxophonist and composer, based in Copenhagen, Denmark. She is known for her extended and experimental vocal techniques, often mixed with the use of live electronic processing, and for her collaborations with artists such as Jon Balke, Theo Bleckmann, John Hollenbeck, Lionel Loueke, Chick Corea, Trondheim Jazz Orchestra, Trondheim Voices, Christian Wallumrød, Marc Ducret, Mats Gustafsson, Bo Stief, Marilyn Mazur, Terje Isungset, Nikolaj Hess, Mikkel Ploug and John Tchicai.

Pettersen's work also incorporates performance, theatre and visual art. She has collaborated with choreographers such as Kjersti Alveberg and Stuart Lynch and in a series of projects with Cirka Teater. She has exhibited paintings and graphic prints in Norway (Rana Kunstmuseum, Galleri Fenka) and Denmark (Galleri Arleth), and has made cover art for the German record label Winter & Winter.

Discography

As leader/co-leader 
 2014: Equilibrium, Liquid Light, Songlines
 2011: Equilibrium, Walking Voices, Songlines
 2011: Lift & Thomas Agergaard, Convocation, Gateway
 2009: Equilibrium, Songlines
 2009: A Word, duo with Nikolaj Hess, Calibrated
 2007: Lift vs Sydow, Gateway
 2006: By This River, duo with Nikolaj Hess Music For Dreams
 2004: Disappearhear, duo with David Thor Johnsson, Park Grammofon
 2002: Mandala, Acoustic Records

Other projects 
Marilyn Mazur & TRITONUS, Eksistens, 2014
Tree House, Trondheim Jazzorkester+Albatrosh, 2014
Blood Sings, The Music Of Suzanne Vega, Animal Music, 2012
Kinetic Music, Trondheim Jazzorkester/Magic Pocket, 2011
Dolls & Guns, Kevin Brow, 2011
The Open Road, John Sund 2011
Improvoicing, Trondheim Voices 2010
City Stories, Daniel Herskedal 2010
What If? Trondheim Jazzorkester/Erlend Skomsvoll 2009
Kobert Trondheim Jazzorkester 2009
Lyckokatt, Anna Kruse 2009
Dancing Trees, Joakim Milder/ Olav Kallhovd 2007
Themes Of Hope, Ayi Solomon 2008
Hymns In Time, Mads Granum Kvartet 2006

External links 
 
 allaboutjazz.com equilibrium review

Norwegian jazz singers
Norwegian jazz saxophonists
1977 births
Living people
Trondheim Voices members